Apne Dushman is a 1975 Bollywood drama film directed by Kailash Bandari. The film stars Dharmendra, Reena Roy and Sanjeev Kumar in lead roles.

Cast
 Dharmendra as Brijesh
 Sanjeev Kumar as Doctor
 Reena Roy as Reshma
 Rakesh Pandey as Mr Singh
 Mohan Choti
 Rajan Haksar as Ustad Raghu
 Dev Kumar

Songs
"Is Desh Ka Socho Kya Hoga" - Mohammed Rafi
"Ho Laga Aisa Pichhe Mai Ho Gayi Re Banwariya" - Asha Bhosle

References

External links
 

1975 films
1970s Hindi-language films
Films scored by Kalyanji Anandji